Jerzy Choromański (born 16 December 1954) is a Polish wrestler. He competed in the men's Greco-Roman 130 kg at the 1992 Summer Olympics.

References

1954 births
Living people
Polish male sport wrestlers
Olympic wrestlers of Poland
Wrestlers at the 1992 Summer Olympics
Sportspeople from Białystok